Quechuamyia is a genus of crane fly in the family Limoniidae.

Distribution
Ecuador.

Species
Q. phantasma Alexander, 1943

References

Limoniidae
Diptera of South America